is a type of Japanese pottery traditionally from Ōtsu, in the former Zeze Domain in Ōmi Province.

External links 

 http://zezeyaki.jp

Culture in Shiga Prefecture
Japanese pottery
Ōtsu